Lisa Spangler Verzosa (born October 17, 1995) is a mixed martial artist (MMA) from the United States, competing in the bantamweight division for the Invicta Fighting Championships (Invicta).

Background 
Spangler started playing football and competing in wrestling and karate when she was young, and transitioned to mixed martial arts at the age of 14 after joining Gladiator MMA gym in Vancouver.

Mixed martial arts career

Early career 
Spangler started her amateur MMA career since 2015 and fought almost primary under KOTC promotion. She amassed a record of 7-0 prior signed by Invicta.

Invicta Fighting Championships
Spangler made her Invicta debut on May 4, 2018 at Invicta FC 29: Kaufman vs. Lehner against Sarah Kleczka. She won the fight via unanimous decision.

CageSport MMA
Spangler face Kelly Clayton on July 2, 2018 at CageSport 52. She won the fight via majority decision.

Return to Invicta Fighting Championships
Spangler return to Invicta and  faced Shanna Young on September 1, 2018, at   Invicta FC 31: Jandiroba vs. Morandin, replacing Raquel Pa'aluhi. She won the fight via a split decision.

On June 7, 2019, Spangler face Katharina Lehner at Invicta FC 35: Bennett vs. Rodriguez II. She won the fight via unanimous decision.

Spangler faced Taneisha Tennant for the vacant Invicta FC Bantamweight Championship at Invicta FC 44: A New Era on August 27, 2021. Spangler lost a lop sided unanimous decision.

Spangler is scheduled to face Serena DeJesus on May 11, 2022 at Invicta FC 47.

Mixed martial arts record

|-
|Loss
|align=center|6–2
|Taneisha Tennant
|Decision (unanimous)
|Invicta FC 44: A New Era
|
|align=center|5
|align=center|5:00
|Kansas City, Kansas, United States
|
|-
| Win
| align=center|6–1
| Raquel Canuto
| Decision (split)
| Invicta FC 42: Cummins vs. Zappitella 
|  
| align=center| 3
| align=center| 5:00
| Kansas City, Kansas, United States
|
|-
| Loss
| align=center|5–1
| Julija Stoliarenko
| Decision (split)
| Invicta FC Phoenix Series 3 
|  
| align=center| 5
| align=center| 5:00
| Kansas City, Kansas, United States
|
|-
| Win
| align=center|5–0
| Kerri Kenneson
| Decision (unanimous)
| Invicta FC 38: Murato vs. Ducote 
|  
| align=center| 3
| align=center| 5:00
| Kansas City, Kansas, United States
| 
|-
| Win
| align=center| 4–0
| Katharina Lehner
| Decision (unanimous)
| Invicta FC 35: Bennett vs. Rodriguez II 
|  
| align=center| 3
| align=center| 5:00
| Kansas City, Kansas, United States
| 
|-
| Win
| align=center| 3–0
| Shanna Young
| Decision (split)
| Invicta FC 31: Jandiroba vs. Morandin 
| 
| align=center| 3
| align=center| 5:00
| Kansas City, Missouri, United States
|
|-
| Win
| align=center| 2–0
| Kelly Clayton
| Decision (majority)
| CageSport 52
| 
| align=center| 3
| align=center| 5:00
| Tacoma, Washington, United States
|
|-
| Win
| align=center| 1–0
| Sarah Kleczka
| Decision (unanimous)
| Invicta FC 29: Kaufman vs. Lehner
| 
| align=center| 3
| align=center| 5:00
| Kansas City, Missouri, United States
|
|-

References

External links
 
 Lisa Spangler at Invicta FC

Living people
1993 births
Bantamweight mixed martial artists
Mixed martial artists utilizing wrestling
Mixed martial artists utilizing karate
Mixed martial artists utilizing boxing
Mixed martial artists utilizing Brazilian jiu-jitsu
American female mixed martial artists
American female karateka
American practitioners of Brazilian jiu-jitsu
Female Brazilian jiu-jitsu practitioners
21st-century American women